Luigi Bestagini (28 August 1919 – 2 May 1993) was an Italian ice hockey player. He competed in the men's tournament at the 1948 Winter Olympics.

References

1919 births
1993 deaths
Olympic ice hockey players of Italy
Ice hockey players at the 1948 Winter Olympics
Ice hockey people from Milan